David Dawson, (born 4 March 1972) is a British dancer and choreographer. Since his career debut, Dawson has released over 20 creations. Noted for his atmospheric, emotionally physical pieces, Dawson received numerous honours and awards.

Education and dance career

Born in London, Dawson began to dance at the age of 7 and received his early training at the Rona Hart School of Dance and the Arts Educational School. He went on to train at the Royal Ballet School, in dance and choreography.

In 1991 he received the Alicia Markova Award, won the Prix de Lausanne, and was offered a contract by the Birmingham Royal Ballet. Under the direction of Sir Peter Wright, he performed leading roles in all the classical repertoire as well as in ballets by Sir Kenneth MacMillan, Sir Frederick Ashton, Sir Peter Wright, and David Bintley. He was nominated as Best Newcomer of the Season by 'Dance & Dancers' magazine in 1992.

In 1994, he joined the English National Ballet under the direction of Derek Deane as a soloist. A year later, he moved to Amsterdam to perform with Wayne Eagling's Dutch National Ballet. Here Dawson was able to continue dancing in classical productions as well as explore more neo-classical and modern repertoire in the works of George Balanchine, Rudi van Dantzig, and Hans van Manen. Dawson worked with choreographers, and created roles, in new ballets by Sir Kenneth MacMillan, Glen Tetley, Twyla Tharp, Christopher Bruce, Wayne Eagling, Ted Brandsen, Mauro Bigonzetti, Itzik Gallili, Redha, and Christopher D'Amboise.

Subsequently, he joined Ballet Frankfurt, where he worked with William Forsythe, and performed for two more years before deciding to devote his time to creating his new works. Dawson ended his dance career in 2002.

Choreographic career

Dawson choreographed his first ballet in 1997, while with the Dutch National Ballet. It's then artistic director, Wayne Eagling, encouraged him to create for the company's choreographic workshop. This experience resulted in Dawson's first major creation for the main company, A Million Kisses to my Skin, in 2000.

He received the Prix Benois de la Danse in 2003 for choreography and nominated for the UK Critics’ Circle National Dance Award as Best Classical Choreographer for The Grey Area. His process of choreographing this ballet was vividly illustrated in Tim Couchman's film 'The Grey Area' in Creation. Dawson became the first British choreographer to create a ballet (Reverence) for the Mariinsky (Kirov) Ballet for which he was awarded Russia's highest theatre prize for visual art, the Golden Mask Award, as Best Choreographer.  He received the Choo San Goh Award for Choreography for The Gentle Chapters and was nominated for the highest dance prize of the Netherlands, The Golden Swan Award, as Best Choreographer for 00:00. For his re-imagining of Faun(e), created for the English National Ballet's Ballets Russes Festival at the Sadler's Wells in London, Dawson was nominated Best Classical Choreographer for the UK Critics' Circle National Dance Award and the Prix Benois de la Danse Choreography Award in 2010. David Dawson and his Faun(e) were featured in the BBC documentary For Art's Sake: The Story of the Ballets Russes.

Dawson has created numerous ballets internationally, including his full-length Giselle, which had its world premiere at the Dresden Semperoper. Amongst other significant works are day4, On the Nature of Daylight, The World According to Us, Morning Ground, Das Verschwundene|The Disappeared, A Sweet Spell of Oblivion, dancingmadlybackwards, and timelapse/(Mnemosyne) and The Third Light.

Between 2004 and 2012 David Dawson was resident choreographer for the Dutch National Ballet, the Dresden Semperoper Ballet and the Royal Ballet of Flanders. His creations have been introduced to the repertoires of the Boston Ballet, Ballet National de Marseilles, Het (Dutch) Nationale Ballet, Dresden SemperOper Ballett, English National Ballet, Finnish National Ballet, Hungarian National Ballet, Norwegian National Ballet, Mariinsky (Kirov) Ballet, Pacific Northwest Ballet, Royal Ballet of Flanders, Royal New Zealand Ballet, Royal Swedish Ballet, Singapore Dance Theatre, West Australian Ballet, Aalto Ballet Theatre Essen, Slovenian National Ballet, Ballet du Capitole, Vienna State Opera Ballet. Dawson's works have been performed in more than 25 countries and have entered repertoires of many ballet companies.

Choreographic style
Dawson's work is based in the vocabulary of classical ballet and, though Dawson disagrees with the association, is often said to be influenced by William Forsythe. Dawson's website claims that his "personal choreographic style transforms classical ballet in new ways, and his signature works are atmospheric, emotionally physical, abstract/narrative pieces that have been praised by critics and audiences worldwide." He is quoted as saying that he is inspired by "everything that has ever existed and everything that exists now."

Creations
2015 - Empire Noir
2015 - Tristan + Isolde
2013 - The Human Seasons
2013 - Opus.11 
2013 - 5 
2013 - Overture 
2012 - day4
2011 - somewhere music is playing...
2011 - timelapse/(Mnemosyne)
2010 - dancingmadlybackwards
2010 - The Third Light
2009 - Faun(e)
2009 - The World According to Us
2008 - Giselle
2007 - On the Nature of Daylight
2007 - A Sweet Spell of Oblivion
2006 - Das Verschwundene|The Disappeared
2006 - The Gentle Chapters
2005 - Reverence
2004 - Morning Ground
2004 - 00:00
2002 - The Grey Area
2000 - A Million Kisses to my Skin
1999 - Psychic Whack
1998 - Step|Study
1998 - Scenes from an Interview
1997 - Born Slippy

Honours
2014 - UK Critics' Circle National Dance Nominee as Best Classical Choreographer for the creation of The Human Seasons (The winners will be announced at a lunchtime ceremony to be held at a central London venue on Monday, 26 January 2015)
2013 - Golden Swan Award Nominee for Best New Production in The Netherlands for the creation of Overture
 2010 - Prix Benois de la Danse Choreography Nominee as Best Choreographer for the creation of Faun(e)
2010 - UK Critics’ Circle National Dance Award Nominee as Best Classical Choreographer for the creation of Faun(e)
2006 - Golden Mask Award (Russian Federation) Winner as Best Choreographer for the creation of Reverence
2006 - Choo San Goh Choreography Award Winner for the creation of The Gentle Chapters
2005 - UK Critics’ Circle National Dance Award Nominee as Best Classical Choreographer for The Grey Area
2003 - Prix Benois de la Danse Choreography Winner for Best Choreographer for the creation of The Grey Area
2003 - Golden Swan Award Nominee for Best New Production in The Netherlands for the creation of 00:00
1992 - Best Newcomer of the Season Nominee by Dance & Dancers magazine
1991 - Prix de Lausanne Winner
1991 - Alicia Markova Award Winner

References

External links
Official Website
Британский хореограф Дэвид Доусон (Russian Version)
David Dawson on Twitter
Dutch National Ballet trailer of David Dawson's newest creation timelapse/(Mnemosyne)
David Dawson working on the new creation, timelapse/(Mnemosyne) for the Dutch National Ballet
Sneak peek of the new creation, timelapse/(Mnemosyne), for the Dutch National Ballet
Tanznetz Magazine
The Grey Area in Creation (2002 Tim Couchman's documentary on David Dawson creating his award-winning breakthrough ballet for Het Nationale Ballet in Amsterdam) | Part 1
The Grey Area in Creation | Part 2
The Grey Area in Creation | Part 3
Rehearsing the dancers of the Dutch National Ballet for the Dutch premiere of his ballet 'Reverence'
Dawson appears in the BBC documentary, For Art's Sake: The Story of the Ballets Russes - discussing his 'Faun(e)'
The World According to Us
Giselle | Wedding Pas de Cinq 
Giselle | Act 1 Grand Pas de Deux
On the Nature of Daylight
A Sweet Spell of Oblivion | 1st Variation 
A Sweet Spell of Oblivion | 3rd Variation
A Sweet Spell of Oblivion | 5th Variation 
Das Verschwundene | The Disappeared
Morning Ground
The Grey Area
A Million Kisses to my Skin

Ballet choreographers
Prix de Lausanne winners
Prix Benois de la Danse winners
1972 births
Living people